Alan O'Brien (born 20 February 1985) is a former Irish footballer who last played for Wealdstone. O'Brien, who played as a winger, represented the Republic of Ireland at full international level five times, all while he was on the books of Newcastle United.

Club career

Newcastle United 
O'Brien played for Cabinteely and St Josephs at youth level in Ireland before signing for Newcastle United. He played in the under–17 national championship winning team who beat Manchester United 5–2 in a final played over two legs at Old Trafford and St James' Park. He then featured regularly for the Newcastle reserve team during the 2003/04 season, but he suffered a broken leg in a training ground accident in July 2004. O'Brien progressed in the next year to the extent that he was in the first team squad, but he was sent on loan to Carlisle United during October 2005. He scored within 10 minutes of his debut for Carlisle, but the loan spell was cut short due to injury.

O'Brien made his Newcastle first team debut on 7 January 2006 in a FA Cup tie against Mansfield Town. Wolves and Norwich City were interested in signing O'Brien, but Glenn Roeder kept O'Brien due to the demands on a small Newcastle squad. O'Brien eventually made his first full Premier League appearance on 20 January 2007 against West Ham United at St James' Park. He played the full 90 minutes against West Ham, but never made another first team start.

Hibernian 
On 25 June 2007, O'Brien agreed to sign a three-year contract with Scottish Premier League side Hibernian after the expiry of his contract with Newcastle United, who were entitled to compensation. O'Brien initially struggled to win a place in the Hibernian team, and he turned down a loan move to Football League One side Crewe Alexandra in January 2008. He played more regularly for Hibs during the 2008–09 season, although he missed two months due to a knee injury. He was released by the club on 1 July 2009 after his contract was cancelled by mutual consent.

Swindon Town 
Soon after his release by Hibernian, O'Brien signed for Swindon Town. He made his debut for Swindon on the opening day of the 2009–10 season in a 5–0 defeat away at Gillingham.

O'Brien managed four appearances for Swindon before suffering a hamstring injury in August. O'Brien made just one substitute appearance under the management of Paul Hart, who decided to release O'Brien from his contract in April 2011. O'Brien made a total of 40 appearances, the majority as a substitute, in two seasons for Swindon.

Yeovil Town 
O'Brien signed for Yeovil Town on 12 August 2011. He was released from his contract by Yeovil on 4 January 2012, along with Kerrea Gilbert, Flavien Belson and Abdulai Bell-Baggie.

Gateshead 
O'Brien signed for Gateshead on 9 February 2012. He made his debut on 18 February 2012 in a 2–1 defeat against Forest Green Rovers. O'Brien was released by Gateshead at the end of the season.

Hungerford Town 

In the summer of 2012, O'Brien joined Hungerford Town; he made his debut for the club in a 2–1 away win at Bridgwater Town on 18 August 2012.

Wealdstone 

O'Brien signed for National League South side Wealdstone FC in September 2017. His season was affected by a succession of injuries and, by July 2018, decided to retire from football.

International career 
O'Brien was capped by Ireland at several youth levels. After impressing during the pre-season of 2006 he received a call up to the senior squad for the first time, where he joined up with then Newcastle teammates Damien Duff, Stephen Carr, and Shay Given. He came on as a second-half substitute for the friendly match against Netherlands to gain his first full international cap.

Career statistics

Club

International

References

External links

1985 births
Living people
Association footballers from County Dublin
Republic of Ireland association footballers
Republic of Ireland B international footballers
Republic of Ireland expatriate association footballers
Republic of Ireland international footballers
Association football wingers
Expatriate footballers in England
Expatriate footballers in Scotland
Newcastle United F.C. players
Carlisle United F.C. players
Hibernian F.C. players
Swindon Town F.C. players
Yeovil Town F.C. players
Gateshead F.C. players
Hungerford Town F.C. players
Premier League players
English Football League players
National League (English football) players
Scottish Premier League players